Alfa Semedo Esteves (born 30 August 1997) is a Bissau-Guinean professional footballer who plays as a midfielder for Saudi Arabian club Al-Tai and the Guinea-Bissau national team.

Club career
Born in Bissau, Semedo started playing football at local club Fidjus di Bideras. In 2014, aged 16, he moved to Portugal and joined Benfica's youth system. After playing two years for their juniors team, he was loaned out to Vilafranquense in Campeonato de Portugal for one season. On 8 July 2017, he signed a four-year contract with Moreirense in Primeira Liga, with whom he would make his professional debut in a Taça da Liga match against Desportivo das Aves on 30 July that year.

Following his return to Benfica in July 2018 for €2.5 million, Semedo debuted for the first team in a 3–2 home win over Vitória de Guimarães in Primeira Liga on 10 August. Later, on 2 October, he made his UEFA Champions League debut, scoring his first and winning goal for Benfica in a 3–2 away victory over AEK Athens in the UEFA Champions League group stage, thus ending the former's eight-match losing streak in the competition's group stage.

On 31 January 2019, Semedo was loaned out to La Liga side RCD Espanyol until June. On 8 July, he joined English club Nottingham Forest on a season-long loan, along with Benfica teammate Yuri Ribeiro (the latter on a permanent transfer). He scored his first goal for the club in a 1–0 away win over Swansea City on 14 September 2019.

Semedo joined Reading on a season-long loan for the 2020–21 season. He made his debut in a 1–0 victory over Wycombe Wanderers on 20 October 2020. He scored his first goal for Reading in a 2–1 win over Luton Town on 26 December 2020.

On 10 August 2022, Semedo joined Saudi Pro League club Al-Tai on a three-year deal.

International career
He made his debut for Guinea-Bissau national football team on 26 March 2021 in an AFCON 2021 qualifier against Eswatini and scored the team's second goal in a 3–1 win.

Career statistics

Club

International

International goals
Scores and results list Guinea-Bissau's goal tally first. Score column indicates score after each Semedo goal.

Honours
Benfica
Primeira Liga: 2018–19

References

External links

1997 births
Living people
Sportspeople from Bissau
Bissau-Guinean footballers
Guinea-Bissau international footballers
Association football midfielders
Campeonato de Portugal (league) players
Primeira Liga players
La Liga players
English Football League players
Saudi Professional League players
S.L. Benfica footballers
Moreirense F.C. players
RCD Espanyol footballers
Nottingham Forest F.C. players
Reading F.C. players
Al-Tai FC players
Bissau-Guinean expatriate footballers
Bissau-Guinean expatriate sportspeople in Portugal
Bissau-Guinean expatriate sportspeople in Spain
Bissau-Guinean expatriate sportspeople in England
Bissau-Guinean expatriate sportspeople in Saudi Arabia
Expatriate footballers in Portugal
Expatriate footballers in Spain
Expatriate footballers in England
Expatriate footballers in Saudi Arabia
2021 Africa Cup of Nations players